The Zimbabwe men's national tennis team represents Zimbabwe in Davis Cup tennis competition and are governed by the Zimbabwe Tennis Association.
Zimbabwe currently competes in the Europe/Africa Zone of Group II. They last competed in the World Group in 2000.

History

Beginnings
Zimbabwe competed in its first Davis Cup in 1963, as Rhodesia in the European Zone. They would defeat the Netherlands before going on to lose to Sweden in the second round. In the next two years they would get through to the second round of European qualifying. After skipping the 1966 and 1967 edition, they returned to the 1968 edition with protests in the original scheduled venue at Båstad as they had to move it to a neutral location in Southern France. Despite the issue, they would not go on to win a match in two years before taking a break, which would be until 1976 where they were supposed to take on Ireland but after withdrawing from that edition, they lost to Switzerland 3-2.

World Group appearance
In the 1983 edition, they took on Turkey in the opening round of Zone B in the European Draw. After knocking over Turkey, they would lose to the Hungarians at home in the second round of the zone. In 1988, the team moved to Group II where at home they would take out the Group II division as they defeated Egypt to qualify to the top group in Europe. After staying in the Europe division for six years, they had the opportunity to go into the World Group for the first time against the Czech Republic. They would lose to the Czech Republic, before getting into the playoff again in 1997, this time they would win over Austria to qualify through to the World Group for the first time.

Entering the 1998 edition, they were expected to lose to Australia at Mildura. Wayne Black and Byron Black would surprise the world as they won the reverse singles to take the tie 3-2 and causing the big upset of that round. The quarter finals though they would lose 5-0 to the Italian team to record the country best result in a Davis Cup.

Current team (2022)

 Benjamin Lock
 Mehluli Don Ayanda Sibanda
 Courtney John Lock
 Benedict Badza (Junior player)

See also
Davis Cup
Zimbabwe Fed Cup team

References

External links

Davis Cup teams
Davis Cup
Davis Cup